The Plan for Great Works is a 1930 Soviet documentary film directed by Abram Room.

References

Bibliography 
 Christie, Ian & Taylor, Richard. The Film Factory: Russian and Soviet Cinema in Documents 1896-1939. Routledge, 2012.

External links 
 

1930 films
Soviet silent films
1930s Russian-language films
1930 documentary films
Soviet documentary films
Films directed by Abram Room
Soviet black-and-white films
Black-and-white documentary films